Ernest Edward Williams (January 7, 1914 – September 1, 1998) was an American herpetologist. He coined the term ecomorph based on his research on anoles.

Taxa named in honor of Ernest E. Williams
The following species are named in honor of Ernest E. Williams.
Lygodactylus williamsi 
Anolis eewi  (synonym of Anolis planiceps)
Erythrolamprus williamsi 
Strophurus williamsi 
Pelusios williamsi 
Dipsas williamsi 
Anolis ernestwilliamsi 
Phrynops williamsi 
Sphaerodactylus williamsi 
Lepidoblepharis williamsi 
Cynisca williamsi 
Pristimantis ernesti 
Anolis williamsmittermeierorum

Taxa described by Ernest E. Williams
Aldabrachelys 
Anolis anchicayae 
Anolis annectens 
Anolis antioquiae 
Anolis barahonae 
Anolis biporcatus parvauritus 
Anolis brasiliensis 
Anolis calimae 
Anolis caquetae 
Anolis carlostoddi 
Anolis chocorum 
Anolis christophei 
Anolis danieli 
Anolis deltae 
Anolis dissimilis 
Anolis dolichocephalus 
Anolis etheridgei 
Anolis euskalerriari 
Anolis fitchi 
Anolis grahami aquarum 
Anolis huilae 
Anolis ibague 
Anolis imias 
Anolis insolitus 
Anolis kunayalae 
Anolis lamari 
Anolis lineatopus ahenobarbus 
Anolis lineatopus merope 
Anolis lyra 
Anolis maculigula 
Anolis marcanoi 
Anolis medemi 
Anolis menta 
Anolis mirus 
Anolis neblininus 
Anolis nigrolineatus 
Anolis occultus 
Anolis parilis 
Anolis propinquus 
Anolis reconditus 
Anolis ricordi leberi 
Anolis rivalis 
Anolis ruizi 
Anolis rupinae 
Anolis santamartae 
Anolis singularis 
Anolis tetarii 
Anolis vanzolinii 
Anolis vaupesianus 
Anolis vicarius 
Anolis whitemani 
Cnemidophorus vanzoi 
Eleutherodactylus furcyensis 
Eleutherodactylus heminota 
Eleutherodactylus leoncei 
Puertoricomys corozalus 
Urostrophus gallardoi

References

Bibliography 
Gans C (2000). "Obituaries: Ernest Edward Williams 1914-1998". Herpetological Review 31 (1): 10-11.
Losos J, Crompton A, Liem KF (October 1, 2009). "Ernest Edward Williams". Retrieved from HARVARDgazette.
Rhodin AGJ, Miyata K (1983). Advances in Herpetology and Evolutionary Biology : Essays in Honor of Ernest E. Williams..

1914 births
1998 deaths
People from Easton, Pennsylvania
American herpetologists
20th-century American zoologists